The Journal of Financial Economics is a peer-reviewed academic journal published by Elsevier, covering the field of finance. It is considered to be one of the premier finance journals.  According to the Journal Citation Reports, the journal has a 2020 impact factor of 6.988. The journal was founded by Michael C. Jensen, Eugene Fama, and Robert C. Merton in 1974.

Editors
The current editor-in-chief is Toni M. Whited (Ross School of Business).

The following persons are or have been editors or coeditors of the journal:
Eugene Fama, 1974-1977
Michael C. Jensen, 1974-1996
Robert C. Merton, 1974-1977
G. William Schwert, 1979-1986, 1989-2020
John B. Long, 1983-1987, 1988-1996
Clifford W. Smith, 1983-1996
René M. Stulz, 1983-1987
Jerold B. Warner, 1987-1996
Richard S. Ruback, 1988-1996
Wayne Mikkelson, 1993-1996
Ron Kaniel, 2017-2020
David Hirshleifer, 2020-2021
Toni M. Whited, 2014-present

Awards
The journal issues two annual prizes for economics research, Jensen Prize and Fama–DFA Prize.

References

External links

Finance journals
Publications with year of establishment missing
Financial economics
Publications established in  1974
Elsevier academic journals
English-language journals
Monthly journals